Karikalampakkam is a panchayat village in Nettapakkam Commune in the Union Territory of Puducherry, India. It is also a revenue village under Nettapakkam firka. If splitting the Name of Karikalampakkam and translating into English it will give the reason of village name by how it came. Kari - Dark; akalam - Non Leaving; pakkam - the place or location. So when the Pondicherry under French rule, this place identified by the other village people by noticing the full darkness; occupying entire area of the village even at day time, because this village covered fully by big trees and it won't allow the light passing inside.

Geography
Karikalampakkam is bordered by Chellancherry village (Tamil nadu) in the west, Korkadu in the north,  Pudukkadai  village (Tamil nadu) in the east and Malattar in the south.

Transport
Karikalampakkam is located at 15 km. from Pondicherry. Karikalampakkam  can be reached directly by any bus running between Puducherry - Maducarai or Puducherry- Bahour via Karikalampakkam.

Road Network
Karikalampakkam  is connected to Pondicherry by  both Villianur-Bahour road (RC-18) and Thavalakuppam-Embalam road (RC-20). In fact, Karikalampakkam is located at the junction of RC-18 and RC-20.

Politics
Karikalampakkam is a part of Embalam (Union Territory Assembly constituency) which comes under Puducherry (Lok Sabha constituency)

References

External links
 Official website of the Government of the Union Territory of Puducherry

Villages in Puducherry district